Szymon Drewniak (born 11 July 1993) is a Polish professional footballer who plays as a midfielder for Chojniczanka Chojnice.

Club career
On 29 July 2020 he signed a two-year contract with Arka Gdynia.

Career statistics

Club

1 Including Polish Super Cup.

Honours

Club
Lech Poznań
 Ekstraklasa: 2014–15

References

1993 births
Footballers from Poznań
Living people
Polish footballers
Poland youth international footballers
Association football midfielders
Lech Poznań players
Lech Poznań II players
Górnik Zabrze players
Chrobry Głogów players
Górnik Łęczna players
MKS Cracovia (football) players
Arka Gdynia players
Odra Opole players
Chojniczanka Chojnice players
Ekstraklasa players
I liga players
III liga players